The Ilidža International Children's Folklore Festival is an annual cultural festival held in Ilidža, Sarajevo, Bosnia and Herzegovina. The festival was established in 2009 by UDM " NOMINATIV " with the purpose of promoting friendship and cultural exchange between children from the ages of 10 to 14. It is held in June of every year and lasts for three days, showcasing over 1000 performers per edition. The festival has hosted folklore groups from Albania, Serbia, Croatia, Macedonia, Greece, Bulgaria, Russia, Ukraine, Turkey, Montenegro, Moldova, Romania, Poland, Czech Republic, Slovakia, Hungary, Kosovo, Lithuania, Israel, Belarus

References

https://www.opcinailidza.ba/news/default/odrzan-deveti-medunarodni-djeciji-festival-folklora?page=6
https://www.facebook.com/udmnominativ/

Festivals established in 2009
June events
Tourist attractions in Sarajevo
Annual events in Bosnia and Herzegovina
Folk festivals in Bosnia and Herzegovina
Festivals in Sarajevo
2009 establishments in Bosnia and Herzegovina